Phragmipedium lindenii is a species of orchid found from Venezuela to Ecuador.

References

External links 

lindenii
Orchids of Ecuador
Orchids of Venezuela